Mykola Yunakiv (December 6, 1871 Chuhuiv, Kharkov Governorate – August 1, 1931 Tarnów, Poland) was a Ukrainian general, military pedagogue. He was a general in the army of the Russian Empire and the Ukrainian People's Republic.

Yunakiv finished the Nicholas General Staff Academy in Saint Petersburg (1894–1897). In 1910 he defended his dissertation on the Swedish campaign in Ukraine 1708-09 and year later became a professor of a military history. In 1914 Yunakiv was pressured to resign after his implementation of teaching reforms found no support in the academy.

During World War I Yunakiv was appointed as a chief of staff serving for the Russian 4th Army and later a commander of the 8th Army fighting on the Romanian Front. In a critical period in the history of the Ukrainian People's Republic in December 1917 he joined the Ukrainian military administration as a head of the education department.

In August 1919 he was appointed as a chief of joint staff for both the Ukrainian armies during the counter advance onto Kiev and Odessa. On October 10, 1919 Yunakiv was promoted to Major General and during the following year briefly served as minister of defense and as head of the Supreme Military Council of Ukraine. Later he emigrated to Poland where he was a member of the Ukrainian Military History Society and the editorial collective of Za derzhavnist’.

External links 
 Mykola Yunakiv at the Encyclopedia of Ukraine
 Yakymovych, B. Armed forces of Ukraine: historical overview. Krypiakevych Institute of Ukrainian Studies of National Academy of Sciences of Ukraine, 1996
 Shankovsky, L. Ukrainian Army in the struggle for a statehood. "Dniprova Khvylya", 1958.
 The Ukrainian quarterly, Vol.13. "Ukrainian Congress Committee of America", 1957.
  

1871 births
1931 deaths
People from Chuhuiv
People from Kharkov Governorate
Ukrainian people in the Russian Empire
Defence ministers of Ukraine
Ukrainian generals
Russian military personnel of World War I
Ukrainian people of World War I
Recipients of the Order of St. Anna, 1st class
Recipients of the Order of St. Anna, 2nd class
Recipients of the Order of St. Anna, 3rd class
Recipients of the Order of St. Vladimir, 3rd class
Recipients of the Order of St. Vladimir, 4th class
Recipients of the Order of Saint Stanislaus (Russian), 1st class
Recipients of the Order of Saint Stanislaus (Russian), 2nd class
Recipients of the Order of Saint Stanislaus (Russian), 3rd class